Nizhneye Novokosteyevo (Tübänge Yañı Kästäy) is a rural locality (a village) in Mikhaylovsky Selsoviet, Bakalinsky District, Bashkortostan, Russia. The population was 14 as of 2010. There are 2 streets.

Geography 
Nizhneye Novokosteyevo is located 27 km south of Bakaly (the district's administrative centre) by road. Chumalya is the nearest rural locality.

References 

Rural localities in Bakalinsky District